Figures in Irish mythology include the following:

Mythological Cycle

Tuatha Dé Danann

Notable figures
Aengus - god possibly associated with love, youth and poetic inspiration
Áine - goddess of love, summer, wealth and sovereignty
Banba, Ériu and Fódla - patron goddesses of Ireland
Bodb Derg - king of the Tuatha Dé Danann
Brigid - daughter of the Dagda; associated with healing, fertility, craft and poetry
Clíodhna - queen of the Banshees
The Dagda - supreme god and king of the Tuatha Dé Danann
Danu - mother goddess of the Tuatha Dé Danann
Dian Cecht - god of healing
Étaín - heroine of Tochmarc Étaíne
Lir - god of the sea
Lugh - legendary hero and High King of Ireland
Maine mac Darthacht - owner of a cloak fastened by eight stones 
Manannán mac Lir - god of the sea, like his father Lir
Nuada Airgetlám - first king of the Tuatha Dé Danann
Ogma - warrior-poet, said to have invented the Ogham alphabet
Trí Dée Dána - three gods of crafting
Creidhne - artificer of the Tuatha Dé Danann, working in bronze, brass and gold
Goibniu - smith of the Tuatha Dé Danann
Luchtaine - carpenter of the Tuatha Dé Danann
The Triple Goddess
Badb - war goddess who caused fear and confusion among soldiers, often taking the form of a crow
Macha - goddess associated with war, battle, horses and sovereignty
The Morrígan - goddess of battle, strife and fertility

Lesser figures
Abartach - also known as the Giolla Deacair ("the hard servant"), he was associated with Fionn mac Cumhaill
Abcán - dwarf poet of the Tuatha Dé Danann
Abhean - poet of the Tuatha Dé Danann
Aed - god of the underworld
Aoi Mac Ollamain - god of poetry
Airmed - daughter of Dian Cecht; associated with healing
Anann - another name for the Morrígan
Beag - minor goddess, known for possessing a magic well
Bé Chuille - sorceress of the Tuatha Dé Danann
Bébinn - goddess associated with birth
Boann - goddess of the River Boyne
Brea - minor god of the Tuatha Dé Danann
Bres - unpopular and treacherous fomorian king of the Tuatha Dé Danann
Brian - son of Tuireann and murderer of Cían
Caer Ibormeith - princess cursed to spend every second year in the form of a swan
Cermait - son of the Dagda, killed by Lugh
Cían - father of Lugh; able to shapeshift at will
Danand - daughter of Delbáeth
Delbáeth - king of the Tuatha Dé Danann
Ecne - god of wisdom and knowledge
Egobail - foster son of Manannan mac Lir and father of Aine
Elcmar - chief steward to the Dagda
Ernmas - mother goddess
Fand - sea goddess and lover of Cú Chulainn
Fiacha mac Delbaíth - legendary High King of Ireland
Fionnuala - daughter of Lir, who was transformed into a swan and cursed by her stepmother
Flidais - goddess of cattle and milking
Fuamnach - witch of the Tuatha Dé Danann
Iuchar - son of Tuireann and murderer of Cían
Iucharba - son of Tuireann and murderer of Cían
Lí Ban - sister of Fand
Mac Cuill, Mac Cecht and Mac Gréine - trio of brothers who killed Lugh and shared the kingship of Ireland between each other
Miach - healer and son of Dian Cecht, killed by his father out of jealousy due to his superior healing talents
Midir - son of the Dagda
Nechtan - father and/or husband of Boann
Neit - god of war
Nemain - a goddess of war; possibly an alternative name for Badb
Niamh - queen of Tír na nÓg
Tuireann - father of Creidhne, Luchtaine and Goibniu

Fir Bolg
Eochaid mac Eirc - High King of Ireland, the last Fir Bolg king and the first king to establish a system of justice
Fiacha Cennfinnán - High King of Ireland
Fodbgen - High King of Ireland
Gaillimh iníon Breasail - mythical woman from whom the river and city of Galway derive their name
Gann and Genann - joint High Kings of Ireland
Rinnal - High King of Ireland and the first king to use spearheads
Rudraige mac Dela - second High King of Ireland
Sengann mac Dela - High King of Ireland
Sláine mac Dela - first High King of Ireland
Sreng - champion of the Fir Bolg who cut off Nuada's arm
Tailtiu - wife of Eochaid mac Eirc

Fomorians
Balor - last king of the Fomorians, capable of killing with his deadly eye
Buarainech - parent of Balor
Cethlenn - prophetess and wife of Balor
Cichol Gricenchos - early leader of the Fomorians
Conand - oppressive leader of the Fomorians
Elatha - Fomorian prince
Tethra - ruler of Mag Mell following his death during the Second Battle of Mag Tuired
Ethniu - daughter of Balor and mother of Lugh

Milesians
Amergin Glúingel - druid, bard and judge
Eber Finn - High King of Ireland
Érimón - High King of Ireland
Míl Espáine - Irish ancestral figure

Ulster Cycle

Major characters
Ailill mac Máta - king of Connacht and husband of Medb
Conchobar mac Nessa - king of Ulster
Cú Chulainn - mythological hero known for his terrible battle frenzy
Deirdre - tragic heroine of the Ulster Cycle; when she was born it was prophesied that she would be beautiful, but that kings and lords would go to war over her
Donn Cuailnge - Brown Bull of Cooley, an extremely fertile stud bull over whom the war known as the Táin Bó Cúailnge was fought
Fergus mac Róich - former king of Ulster, now in exile
Medb - queen of Connacht, best known for starting the Táin Bó Cúailnge

Ulster characters
Amergin mac Eccit - poet and warrior in the court of Conchobar mac Nessa
Athirne - poet and satirist in the court of Conchobar mac Nessa
Blaí Briugu - Ulster warrior with a geis which requires him to sleep with any woman who stays at his hostel unaccompanied
Bricriu - hospitaller, troublemaker and poet
Cathbad - chief druid in the court of Conchobar mac Nessa
Celtchar - hero of the Ulaid
Cethern mac Fintain - Ulster warrior who assists Cú Chulainn
Conall Cernach - hero of the Ulaid
Cruinniuc - wealthy cattle owner who marries a mysterious woman, later revealed to be the goddess Macha
Cúscraid - son of Conchobar mac Nessa
Dáire mac Fiachna - Ulster cattle-lord and owner of Donn Cuailnge, the Brown Bull of Cooley
Deichtine - mother of Cú Chulainn
Éogan mac Durthacht - King of Fernmag
Fedlimid mac Daill - harper and chief storyteller in the court of Conchobar mac Nessa
Fergus Mac Roich - Former king of Ulster. Narrator of Tain Bo Cuailnge.
Findchóem - sister of Conchobar mac Nessa and wet nurse of Cú Chulainn
Furbaide Ferbend - son of Conchobar mac Nessa
Láeg - charioteer of Cú Chulainn
Lóegaire Búadach - hapless Ulster warrior who functions largely as comic relief
Mugain - wife of Conchobar mac Nessa
Naoise - lover of Deirdre
Ness - mother of Conchobar mac Nessa
Súaltam - mortal father of Cú Chulainn

Connacht characters
Bélchú - warrior of Connacht
Cet mac Mágach - warrior of Connacht
Ferdiad - warrior of Connacht
Findabair - daughter of Ailill and Medb
Fráech - warrior of Connacht, who woos Findabair
Nera - warrior of Connacht

Ulster exiles
Cormac Cond Longas - eldest son of Conchobar mac Nessa
Dubthach Dóeltenga - cynical ally of Fergus mac Róich

Other characters
Achall - daughter of Cairbre Nia Fer
Áed Rúad, Díthorba and Cimbáeth - three brothers who shared the kingship of Ireland
Aífe - rival of Scáthach
Bláthnat - wife of Cú Roí and lover of Cú Chulainn
Connla - son of Cú Chulainn and Aife
Cairbre Nia Fer - king of Tara
Cú Roí - warrior king of Munster
Emer wife of Cú Chulainn
Erc mac Cairpri - son of Cairbre Nia Fer
Fedelm - female prophet and poet
Fedelm Noíchrothach - daughter of Conchobar mac Nessa, unfaithful wife of Cairbre Nia Fer and lover of both Cú Chulainn and Conall Cernach
Flidais - lover of Fergus mac Róich
Lugaid mac Con Roí - son of Cú Roí and killer of Cú Chulainn
Mesgegra - king of Leinster
Scáthach - legendary warrior woman who trains Cú Chulainn in the arts of combat
Uathach - daughter of Scáthach

Fenian Cycle

The Fianna
Fionn mac Cumhaill - legendary hunter-warrior and leader of the Fianna
Caílte mac Rónáin - warrior of the Fianna who could run at remarkable speed and communicate with animals, and was a great storyteller
Conán mac Morna - warrior of the Fianna, often portrayed as a troublemaker and a comic figure
Cumhall - leader of the Fianna and father of Fionn mac Cumhaill
Diarmuid Ua Duibhne - warrior of the Fianna and lover of Fionn's betrothed, Gráinne
Goll mac Morna - warrior of the Fianna and uneasy ally of Fionn mac Cumhaill
Liath Luachra - Fionn's foster mother and a great warrior
Liath Luachra - tall, hideous warrior of the Fianna who shares his name with Fionn's foster mother
Oisín - son of Fionn mac Cumhaill, warrior of the Fianna and a great poet
Oscar - warrior son of Oisín and Niamh

Other characters
Aillen - monstrous being killed by Fionn mac Cumhaill
Bodhmall - druidess, warrior woman and aunt of Fionn mac Cumhaill
Cormac mac Airt - legendary High King of Ireland
Finn Eces - poet, sage, and teacher of Fionn mac Cumhaill
Gráinne - lover of Diarmuid Ua Duibhne, betrothed to Fionn mac Cumhaill
Mug Ruith - powerful blind druid
Plor na mBan - daughter of Oisín and Niamh
Sadhbh - mother of Oisín by Fionn mac Cumhaill

Other
Aibell - fairy queen of Thomond
Amadan Dubh - trickster fairy known as the "dark fool"
Cailleach - divine hag
Canola - mythical inventor of the harp
Medb Lethderg - goddess of sovereignty associated with Tara
Tlachtga - powerful druidess

Irish deities
Irish
Deities, Irish
Deities, Irish
 
Fantasy creatures